Brick Mower (sometimes stylized brick mower) are a punk rock band formed in 2009 in New Brunswick, New Jersey.  After self-releasing an album and two EPs on their own imprint Viking On Campus and touring with Black Wine, the band signed to Don Giovanni Records.

Discography

Full length records

EPs

References

External links
 Don Giovanni Records Official Website

Musical groups established in 2009
Pop punk groups from New Jersey
Don Giovanni Records artists
New Brunswick, New Jersey